Al-Jinsiya Sport Club is an Iraqi football team based in Baghdad, that plays in Iraq Division One.

Managerial history
  Karim Qumbil
  Hadi Mtanesh
  Haider Jumaa
  Ahmed Daham
  Ahmed Sabri
  Muthana Khalid

See also 
 2021–22 Iraq FA Cup
 2022–23 Iraq FA Cup

References

External links
 Al-Jinsiya SC on Goalzz.com
 Iraq Clubs- Foundation Dates

Football clubs in Iraq
Football clubs in Baghdad
Sport in Baghdad